Munida alia is a species of squat lobster in the family Munididae. The specific epithet is derived from the Latin alius, meaning "another", in reference to the other species that are centered around M. heteracantha.

References

Squat lobsters
Crustaceans described in 1994